Harrison Township is one of fifteen townships in Wayne County, Indiana, United States. As of the 2010 census, its population was 392 and it contained 138 housing units.

History
Harrison Township was organized in 1843.

Geography
The streams of Beard Run, Black Water Branch, College Corner Branch, Mud Run, Oser Creek, Silver Creek, Silver Station Brook and Square Run run through this township.

Unincorporated towns
 College Corner at 
 Jacksonburg at 
(This list is based on USGS data and may include former settlements.)

Adjacent townships
 Clay Township (northeast)
 Center Township (east)
 Jackson Township (west)
 Jefferson Township (northwest)

Cemeteries
The township contains one cemetery, Beard.

Major highways
 Interstate 70
 Indiana State Road 1

References
 
 United States Census Bureau cartographic boundary files

External links
 Indiana Township Association
 United Township Association of Indiana

Townships in Wayne County, Indiana
Townships in Indiana